Rosnay may refer to the following places in France:

 Rosnay, Indre, a commune in the Indre department
 Rosnay, Marne, a commune in the Marne department
 Rosnay, Vendée, a commune in the Vendée department
 Rosnay-l'Hôpital, a commune in the Aube department

Family name
Joël de Rosnay
Tatiana de Rosnay, French writer
Xavier de Rosnay, French electro-house musician, see Justice (French band)